Wyandanch is a hamlet and census-designated place (CDP) in the Town of Babylon in Suffolk County, New York.

Wyandanch may also refer to:

Wyandanch (LIRR station)
Wyandanch (sachem)

See also
 Wyandance (disambiguation)